Gutian is a town in Liancheng County, Fujian province, China. , it has 1 residential community and 14 villages under its administration.

See also 
 List of township-level divisions of Fujian

References 

Township-level divisions of Fujian
Liancheng County